One of Us is a greatest hits album by Joan Osborne, released on June 28, 2005.

Track listing
"One of Us" (Eric Bazilian)
"How Sweet It Is" (Dozier, Holland, Holland)
"Why Can't We Live Together" (Thomas)
"Everybody Is a Star" (Stone)
"Smiling Faces Sometimes" (Strong, Whitfield)
"These Arms of Mine" (Redding)
"Right Hand Man" (Osborne, Bazillian, Chertoff, Hyman, Captain Beefheart)
"Only You and I Know" (Mason)
"Think" (Franklin, White)
"I'll Be Around" (Bell, Hurtt)
"Love's in Need of Love Today" (Wonder)

2005 greatest hits albums
Joan Osborne albums
Artemis Records compilation albums